Soft Play (formerly known as Slaves) are an English punk rock duo formed in Royal Tunbridge Wells in 2012, consisting of Isaac Holman (lead vocals, drums) and Laurie Vincent (backing vocals, guitar, bass). Their music has been described as "British punk with harsh bluesy garage riffs".

History 
As Slaves, the band released their first EP, Sugar Coated Bitter Truth, under Boss Tuneage Records in 2012. Their first single, "Where's Your Car Debbie?", was released by Fonthill Records in early 2014; they were then signed by Virgin EMI. They released their first single under Virgin, "Hey", in November 2014, and released "The Hunter" later that month. They gained more exposure in late 2015 when "The Hunter" was featured on the Sky One series You, Me and the Apocalypse. They also appeared on Later... with Jools Holland and were nominated for the BBC's Sound of 2015.

In May 2015, The Fader featured the group in an article about provocative names for music artists. Vincent told The Fader that criticism of the name came as a surprise to them, describing how they chose the name while trying to think of "an abrasive sounding word, like Clash". He further said, "We just liked the word. We weren't trying to provoke." The two also addressed the controversy around their name in a statement on Facebook: "Our band name relates to people not being in control of their day to day lives. Slaves was our way of getting off the paths we didn't want to walk down anymore. The music we make is motivational and aimed at people personally as well as collectively."

The duo released their debut album, Are You Satisfied?, on 1 June 2015. It reached No. 8 in its first week on the UK Albums Chart. The album was nominated for the 2015 Mercury Music Prize and has since gone Silver in the UK. They released their second album, Take Control, on 30 September 2016. Beastie Boys member Mike D produced the album, and was featured on the track "Consume or Be Consumed". The album fared better in the charts than the first, climbing to No. 6 in its first week on the UK Albums Chart. On 20 March 2018, the band announced its third album, Acts of Fear and Love, was released on 17 August and reached number 8 in the UK album charts. In July 2019, the band released a four-track EP titled The Velvet Ditch and played a headline set at Truck Festival.

In December 2022, the band changed their name to Soft Play, agreeing that "the name Slaves is an issue" and that it "doesn't represent who we are as people or what our music stands for any longer".

Members
 Isaac Holman – lead vocals, drums, trumpet, flute
 Laurence "Laurie" Vincent – backing vocals, guitar, bass, keyboards

Discography

Studio albums
*As "Slaves"

Extended plays

Singles

As lead artist

As featured artist

Songwriting and production credits

References

External links

2012 establishments in England
English musical duos
English punk rock groups
Musical groups established in 2012
Musicians from Royal Tunbridge Wells
Rock music duos
NME Awards winners
Musical groups from Kent
Virgin EMI Records artists